Information and Organization is an academic journal related to the relationship between ICT and different social consequences experienced by different individuals, stakeholders and socieities. Empirical research and relevant theories are published in this journal, while some future research directions in the same area are also offered.

Currently, Information and Organization is being listed as A* under the academic journal list of Australian Business Dean Council (ABDC).

References

Business and management journals
Information systems journals
English-language journals